Leuconitocris buettneri is a species of beetle in the family Cerambycidae. It was described by Hermann Julius Kolbe in 1893.

Subspecies
 Leuconitocris buettneri buettneri (Kolbe, 1893)
 Leuconitocris buettneri seminigrofemoralis (Breuning, 1951)

References

Leuconitocris
Beetles described in 1893
Taxa named by Hermann Julius Kolbe